Sir Gerald Festus Kelly KCVO  (9 April 1879 – 5 January 1972) was a British painter best known for his portraits.

Gerald Kelly was born in London, educated at Eton College and Trinity Hall, Cambridge, and later lived and studied art in Paris. James McNeill Whistler was an early influence. Kelly travelled much, visiting Spain, America, South Africa, and Burma, which inspired a series of paintings of Burmese dancers.

In 1920 he married Lilian Ryan, who became his model for a celebrated series of portraits. These were exhibited under the title Jane, followed by a Roman numeral that corresponded to the year of exhibition. Other sitters included T. S. Eliot, Ralph Vaughan Williams, and Somerset Maugham, whom he painted 18 times.

Maugham, a lifelong friend of Kelly, wrote an introduction to a catalogue (1950) of an exhibition of Kelly's work. Maugham regularly portrayed Kelly in his works, as Lionel Hillier in Cakes and Ale, as Frederick Lawson in Of Human Bondage and as O'Malley in His Excellency presenting him as "the young Irish painter called O'Malley", and dedicating Ashenden to him.

He became a favourite painter of the Royal Family. He was elected to the Royal Academy in 1930, was the Academy's Keeper from 1943–45, and served as its president from 1949–54. Kelly held a number of official positions, such as his membership of the Royal Fine Arts Commission, 1938–43, and was knighted in the 1945 King's Birthday Honours List. The artist John Napper (1916–2001) worked as his assistant. In 1950 he was elected to the National Academy of Design as an Honorary Corresponding Academician.

Kelly died in Exmouth in 1972. He is represented in many public collections, including the Tate Gallery, which holds seven works.

His father was the Rev. Frederic Festus Kelly (1838–1918), formerly the vicar at St Giles', Camberwell where the young Kelly grew up. His grandfather, also named Frederic Festus Kelly, was the founder of Kelly's Directories Ltd. His sister, Rose Edith Kelly, was briefly married to Aleister Crowley.

Kelly's London residence at 117 Gloucester Place in Marylebone is marked by an English Heritage blue plaque placed in 1993.

Notes

References
Hudson, Derek (1975). For Love of Painting
Postle, Martin; Vaughan, William (1999). The Artist's Model from Etty to Spencer. London: Merrell Holberton.

External links
 
 His paintings and short biography
  2008 article on Newport exhibition that includes Gerald Kelly painting
 

1879 births
1972 deaths
Royal Academicians
Alumni of Trinity Hall, Cambridge
20th-century British painters
British male painters
Knights Bachelor
Keepers of the Royal Academy
People educated at Eton College
20th-century British male artists